The governor of Rizal is the local chief executive of the Philippine province of Rizal.

List

Timeline

References

 
Government of Rizal
Governors of provinces of the Philippines
Politics of Rizal